In December 1990, the Saudi Federation decided to merge all the football League with the King's Cup in one tournament and the addition of the Golden Box. The Golden Box would be an end of season knockout competition played between the top four teams of the regular league season.

These teams would play at a semi-final stage to crown the champions of Saudi Arabia.

Al-Shabab came out on top and won their first championship. At the other end of the table, promoted sides Al-Najma and Al-Arabi struggled and were relegated.

Stadia and locations

Final league table

Promoted: Ohud, Al-Nahda.

Semifinals

Third place match

Final

External links 
 RSSSF Stats
 Saudi Arabia Football Federation
 Saudi League Statistics
 Al-Jazirah newspaper 10-06-1991

Saudi Premier League seasons
Saudi Professional League
Professional League